Rae Parish is a rural municipality in northern Estonia. It is a part of Harju County. The municipality has a population of 17,967 (as of 1 January 2018) and covers an area of 206.7 km².

Settlements
Administrative centre of the municipality is Jüri, a small borough. The other biggest populated places are Vaida, Assaku, Lagedi and Peetri small boroughs. The rest of the settlements are villages: Aaviku, Aruvalla, Järveküla, Kadaka, Karla, Kautjala, Kopli, Kurna, Lehmja, Limu, Pajupea, Patika, Pildiküla, Rae, Salu, Seli, Soodevahe, Suuresta, Suursoo, Tuulevälja, Ülejõe, Urvaste, Uuesalu, Vaidasoo, Vaskjala, Veneküla and Veskitaguse. There are altogether 5 small boroughs plus 27 villages & hamlets in Rae Parish.

The current mayor is Madis Sarik (Estonian Reform Party).

Religion

References

External links
Official website (available only in Estonian)